Bungalow 702 is a heritage-listed house at Lam Lok Loh, Drumsite, Christmas Island, Australia. It was added to the Australian Commonwealth Heritage List on 22 June 2004.

Description 
The building has a central gable-roofed section with masonry walls surrounded by a skillion-roofed enclosed verandah of timber framing. The roof cladding is in asbestos cement sheet. Servants quarters are located at the rear of the building, connected by a covered way and roofing is corrugated asbestos cement, with newer sections in corrugated fibre-cement. This building retains its angled ventilation shutters to the verandah openings. Servants quarters are of rendered concrete masonry with a gable roof clad in corrugated asbestos cement.

There is a strong oral tradition on Christmas Island that this bungalow was used by the Japanese as a radio station during the Island's occupation in World War II. The bungalow has become a symbol of this phase of the Island's history and is of considerable social significance to the Christmas Island community.

Condition 

The building was damaged by a storm in March 1988 during which sections of the roof were blown off and less serious damage sustained in other parts of the building. The building was re-roofed in 1991.

The building has since been sold and was in the process of being refurbished in January 2001.

References

Bibliography

Attribution 

Commonwealth Heritage List places on Christmas Island
Historic sites on Christmas Island
Articles incorporating text from the Australian Heritage Database